Shi Pei Pu (December 21, 1938 – June 30, 2009) was a Chinese opera singer from Beijing. He became a spy who obtained secrets from Bernard Boursicot, an employee in the French embassy, during a 20-year-long sexual affair in which the performer convinced the man that he was a woman. He claimed to have had a child that he insisted had been born through their relations. The story made headlines in France when the facts were revealed.

The affair inspired American David Henry Hwang's play M. Butterfly (1988), which was produced on Broadway. It was adapted as the 1993 movie of the same title.

Early life
Shi's father was a college professor, and his mother was a teacher. He had two sisters who were significantly older than he was. Shi grew up in Kunming in the southwestern province of Yunnan, where he learned French and attended the Yunnan University, graduating with a literature degree. By 17, Shi had become an actor and singer who had achieved some recognition. In his 20s, Shi wrote plays about workers.

Relationship with Boursicot
Bernard Boursicot was born in France and was 20 years old when he obtained a job as an accountant at the French embassy in Beijing. It opened in 1964 as the first Western mission in China since the Korean War. As recorded in his diary, Boursicot had previously had sexual relations only with fellow male students in school and wanted to meet a woman and fall in love. He first met Shi, then 26 years old, at a Christmas party in December 1964; the performer was dressed as a man. Shi had been teaching Chinese to families of embassy workers. He told Boursicot that he was "a female Beijing opera singer who had been forced to live as a man to satisfy his father's wish to have a son". The two quickly developed a sexual relationship, maintained in darkness. Shi convinced Boursicot that he was with a woman.

After being discovered by the Chinese government, Boursicot was pressured into providing secret documents from his postings in Beijing from 1969 to 1972 and in Ulaanbaatar, Mongolia from 1977 to 1979. He took more than 500 documents. When Boursicot was stationed outside of China, he saw Shi infrequently, but they maintained their sexual relationship. Shi later showed Shi Du Du, a four-year-old child that Shi insisted was their son, to Boursicot.

Shi and his adopted son were brought to Paris in 1982, after Boursicot was able to arrange for them to enter France. Boursicot was arrested by French authorities on June 30, 1983, and Shi was arrested shortly thereafter. In police custody, Shi explained to doctors how he had hidden his genitals to convince Boursicot that he was a woman. And as the French doctors sent to examine Pei Pu discovered, he could create the appearance of having female genitalia by tucking his testicles and penis into his body. He said that Shi Du Du, their purported son, was from the Uyghur people of China's Xinjiang Province and was sold by his impoverished mother and adopted by Shi Pei Pu. Upon discovering the truth of their relationship, Boursicot attempted suicide by slitting his throat but survived. The public disclosure of the long-term affair made Boursicot the subject of widespread ridicule in France.

Sentence 
Shi and Boursicot were each convicted of espionage in 1986 and sentenced to six years in prison. Shi was pardoned by President of France François Mitterrand April 10, 1987, as part of an effort to defuse tensions between France and China over what was described as a "very silly" and unimportant case. Boursicot was pardoned in August of that year.

The affair inspired David Henry Hwang's 1988 play M. Butterfly. B.D. Wong played Song Liling, a Chinese opera singer and spy based on Shi Pei Pu, in the original Broadway production of the play.

Last years and death 
After his pardon, Shi returned to performing as an opera singer. He was reluctant to share the details of his relationship with Boursicot, stating that he "used to fascinate both men and women" and that "What I was and what they were didn't matter." Shi spoke infrequently with Boursicot over the subsequent years. But in the months before Shi's death, he told Boursicot that he still loved him.

Shi was said to be 70 years old when he died on June 30, 2009, in Paris. Shi is survived by his adopted son, Shi Du Du, who later fathered three sons of his own. Notified at a French nursing home of Shi's death, Boursicot said, "He did so many things against me that he had no pity for, I think it is stupid to play another game now and say I am sad. The plate is clean now. I am free."

References

Further reading
 Torancheau, Patricia. "Avec Shi Peipu, la taupe était myope." Libération. July 21, 2001.
 "Shi Peipu, Shi Dudu und Boursicot Seite 146." Der Spiegel. May 19, 1986.

1938 births
2009 deaths
People convicted of spying for the People's Republic of China
Recipients of French presidential pardons
Chinese LGBT singers
Chinese male Peking opera actors
20th-century Chinese male actors
Singers from Shandong
China–France relations
20th-century Chinese male singers
20th-century Chinese LGBT people